Fogelklou is a Swedish surname. Notable people with the surname include:

 Carl-Johan Fogelklou (born 1980), Swedish musician
 Emilia Fogelklou (1878–1972), Swedish theologian, historian, pacifist, and author

Swedish-language surnames